Bethany Home (sometimes called Bethany House or Bethany Mother and Child Home) was a residential home in Dublin, Ireland, mainly for women of the Protestant faith, who were convicted of petty theft, prostitution, infanticide, as well as women who were pregnant out of wedlock, and the children of these women. The home was run by evangelical Protestants, mainly (up to the 1960s) members of the Church of Ireland. It catered to "fallen women" and operated in Blackhall Place, Dublin (1921–34), and in Orwell Road, Rathgar (1934–72), until its closure. The home sent some children to Northern Ireland, England, and to the United States.

History
Bethany House was founded in Blackhall Place in Dublin in 1921, and moved in 1934 to Orwell Road, Rathgar, where it was based until it was closed in 1972. On opening the home in May 1922 the Church of Ireland Archbishop of Dublin, John Allen Fitzgerald Gregg, declared Bethany "a door of hope for fallen women".  The Dean of Christ Church Cathedral presided over the first evening meeting setting up the Home, and Church of Ireland Prison Mission to Women with Convictions charity was incorporated into the Bethany Home

Following the passage of the Registration of Maternity Homes Act, 1934, Bethany House became subject to inspection by the Department of Local Government and Public Health.
 
In a letter dated 9 April 1945 from the Church of Ireland's then Archbishop of Dublin, Arthur William Barton, to Gerald Boland, then Minister for Justice, he described the home as "a suitable place for Protestant girls on remand". Bethany Home was already a place recognised by the courts as a place of detention.

Critical reports on nursed out Bethany children were compiled in January 1939 by inspectors in the Department of Local Government and Public Health. In August 1939, newspapers reported critical discussion at the Rathdown Board of Guardians on hospitalised Bethany children. The government's Deputy Chief Medical Adviser, Winslow Sterling Berry, visited the home on three occasions in 1939, once in February and twice in October. In February, Sterling Berry reversed an inspection report on a child said to have been in a "dying condition". He stated in October, "it is well recognised that a large number of illegitimate children are delicate and marasmic from their birth." Sterling Berry observed that the home's most objectionable feature was admittance of Roman Catholics into a proselytising institution. He successfully pressured Bethany Home's managing committee into ceasing the admission of Roman Catholics. The Residential Secretary, Hettie Walker, claimed in 1940 that the measure was only agreed to because of a threat of refusal of funding under new legislation.

The superintendent of the Church of Ireland's Irish Church Missions to the Roman Catholics, the Revd T.C. Hammond, was a member of the home's managing committee. In the 1950s Bethany Home facilitated the adoption of children by Protestant families in the United States, while some sent to Barnardo's in England may have been sent on to Australia.

During the 1960s children were transferred from the Bethany Home to the Protestant evangelical Westbank Orphanage in Greystones (which closed in 1998), from which few children were adopted.

Children from the Bethany Home were also sent to the Irish Church Mission managed, Boley Home, in Monkstown, Co. Dublin.

Bethany Home closed in 1972. In 1974, its assets were distributed to two other Church of Ireland run institutions, 85% to the Church of Ireland, Magdalen Home (founded by Lady Arabella Denny) on Leeson Street and 15% to Miss Carr's Home, North Circular Road, Dublin. The records of the Bethany Home are held by PACT (the Protestant adoption service), along with records of other Church of Ireland social services.

Mount Jerome Graves
222 children died in Bethany Home between 1922–49 and 219 were buried in unmarked graves in Mount Jerome Cemetery, Harold's Cross, Dublin. In 2010, a memorial meeting was held in the cemetery to remember them, in attendance was some former residents and relatives of residents along with public figures such as independent Senator David Norris, Joe Costello, TD, and Labour Equality spokeswoman, Kathleen Lynch.

Bethany Survivors Group
The Bethany Home Survivors Group campaigns for redress on behalf former residents. The group has called on the Church of Ireland to publicly support this demand and to acknowledge its role in the home. The group called on the Irish government and on the Commission to Inquire into Child Abuse, to permit Bethany Home to be included in the state redress scheme, The group's call to be added to the State redress scheme for victims of child sexual abuse received political support. In May 2011 the survivors group met with the Church of Ireland's Archbishop of Dublin, the Most Revd Michael Jackson, as part of their campaign.

Former Bethany residents called for inclusion in an inquiry headed by Senator Martin McAleese, into the state's role in the Magdalene Laundries, as similarities were drawn between both institutions and the needs of survivors. Irish Education Minister Ruairi Quinn, subsequently announced in June 2011 a refusal to include Bethany Home in the McAleese inquiry. Justice for Magdalenes (JFM) then opposed Quinn's announcement and supported the call for the inclusion of the Bethany Home in the McAleese Inquiry.

On 16 September 2019, James Fenning and Paul Graham, were featured on BBC Newsline, about their fight for redress from the Irish Government.

Bethany born notables
 Derek Leinster, writer (Hannah's Shame, 2005; Destiny Unknown, 2008), chairperson, Bethany Survivor Group.
 Patrick Anderson-McQuoid, artist who worked with the Irish Ballet Company in Cork City before founding and serving as artistic director of the Triskel Arts in that city; currently resident in County Leitrim.
 Tom McClean, former British paratrooper, SAS/Parachute Regiment, who planted the Union Jack on Rockall Island in 1985. He had been sent to an English orphanage at the age of 3. He authored Rough Passage (1983).

See also
 Kirwan House
 Georgia Tann
 Belvedere Protestant Children's Orphanage
 Westbank Orphanage
 PACT (Protestant Adoption Society)
 Dublin Female Penitentiary, North Cicular Road, Dublin
 St Patrick's Mother and Baby Home

References

External links
 PACT records of the Bethany Home
 Bethany Home – Magdalene Laundries Website.
 Church & State and The Bethany Home by Niall Meehan, supplement to History Ireland, Vol 18, No 5, September–October 2010
 The Irish State & the Bethany Home by Niall Meehan, submission to Ruairi Quinn, Minister for Education, Leinster House, 24 May 2011, by delegation consisting of Derek Leinster, Noleen Belton, Patrick Anderson McQuoid, Niall Meehan, Joe Costello TD
 Proposal to include Bethany Home within the remit of Senator Martin McAleese’s investigation of state interactions with Magdalene institutions, Niall Meehan (Griffith College Dublin) and Joe Costello TD, meeting with Minister of State, Dept of Justice Equality & Law Reform, Kathleen Lynch TD, Leinster House, 14 July 2011
 Derek Leinster Website

Social history of Ireland
Buildings and structures in Dublin (city)
Imprisonment and detention
1921 establishments in Ireland
Church of Ireland buildings and structures in Ireland
History of Christianity in Ireland
Mother and baby homes in Ireland
1972 disestablishments in Ireland